The 2021 Sunshine Ladies Tour was the 8th season of the Sunshine Ladies Tour, a series of professional golf tournaments for women based in South Africa.

Schedule
The condensed season consisted of 6 events, all held in South Africa, played in April and May, after having been postponed from February–March due to the COVID-19 pandemic. 

The Investec South African Women's Open was again co-sanctioned with the Ladies European Tour, and also a qualifier for the 2021 U.S. Women's Open.

Order of Merit
This shows the leaders in the final Order of Merit.

Source:

References

External links
Official homepage of the Sunshine Ladies Tour

Sunshine Ladies Tour
Sunshine Ladies Tour